Michel Tournier (19 December 1924 − 18 January 2016) was a French writer. He won awards such as the Grand Prix du roman de l'Académie française in 1967 for Friday, or, The Other Island and the Prix Goncourt for The Erl-King in 1970. 
His inspirations included traditional German culture, Catholicism and the philosophies of Gaston Bachelard. He resided in Choisel and was a member of the Académie Goncourt. His autobiography has been translated and published as The Wind Spirit (Beacon Press, 1988). He was on occasion in contention for the Nobel Prize in Literature.

Biography
Born in France of parents who met at the Sorbonne while studying German, Tournier spent his youth in Saint-Germain-en-Laye. He learned German early, staying each summer in Germany. He studied philosophy at the Sorbonne and at the university of Tübingen and attended Maurice de Gandillac's course. He wished to teach philosophy at high-school but, like his father, failed to obtain the French agrégation.

Tournier joined Radio France as a journalist and translator and hosted L'heure de la culture française. In 1954 he worked in advertisement for Europe 1. He also collaborated for Le Monde and Le Figaro. From 1958 to 1968, Tournier was the chief editor of Plon. In 1967 Tournier published his first book, Vendredi ou les Limbes du Pacifique, a retelling of Daniel Defoe's Robinson Crusoe, for which he was awarded the Grand Prix du roman de l'Académie française.

He co-founded in 1970, with the Arles photographer Lucien Clergue and the historian Jean-Maurice Rouquette, the Rencontres d'Arles. At the same time he produced for television some fifty issues of the monthly program Chambre noire, devoted to photography interviewing a photographer for each program.

Tournier died on 18 January 2016 in Choisel, France at the age of 91.

Selected works
 Vendredi ou les Limbes du Pacifique (Friday) (1967) - Grand Prix du roman de l'Académie française
 Le Roi des aulnes (1970) (The Erl-King translated 1972 by Barbara Bray, a.k.a. The Ogre)
 Le Roi des aulnes was made into a 1996 movie Der Unhold (The Ogre) directed by Volker Schlöndorff and has also been adapted for the stage by Tom Perrin in 2002.
 Les Météores (Gemini, 1975)
 Le Vent Paraclet (The Wind Spirit, 1977)
 Vendredi ou la Vie sauvage (Friday and Robinson, 1972)
 Le Coq de bruyère (The Fetishist and Other Stories, 1978)
 Gaspard, Melchior et Balthazar (The Four Wise Men, 1980)
 Le Vol du vampire (1981)
 Gilles et Jeanne (Gilles and Jeanne, 1983)
 La Goutte d'or (The Golden Droplet, 1986)
 Petites Proses (1986)
 Le Medianoche amoureux (The Midnight Love Feast, 1989)
 La Couleuvrine (1994)
 Le Miroir des idées (The Mirror of Ideas, 1994)
 Eléazar ou la Source et le Buisson (Eleazar, Exodus to the West, 1996)
 Journal extime (2002)

Notes

References 
 Jean-Louis de Rambures, "Comment travaillent les écrivains", Paris 1978 (interview with M. Tournier)

Further reading 
 
 Christopher Anderson. Michel Tournier's Children: Myth, Intertext, Initiation. Peter Lang. 1998. 145pp.
 Walter Redfern: Le Coq De Bruyere. Michel Tournier. Fairleigh Dickinson University Press. 1996. 138pp.
 William Cloonan. Michel Tournier. Twayne. 1985. 110pp.
 Colin Davis. Michel Tournier: Philosophy and Fiction. Clarendon Press. 1988. 222pp.
 Rachel Edwards. Myth and the Fiction of Michel Tournier and Patrick Grainville. Edwin Mellen Press. 1999. 310pp.
 David Gascoigne. Michel Tournier. Berg. 1996. 234pp.
 Mairi Maclean. Michel Tournier: Exploring Human Relations. Bristol Academic. 2003. 308pp.
 Susan Petit. Michel Tournier's Metaphysical Fictions. John Benjamins Publishing Company. 1991. 224pp.
 Pary Pezechkian-Weinberg. Michel Tournier: marginalité et création. Peter Lang. 1997. 170pp. Language: French.
 David Platten. Michel Tournier and the Metaphor of Fiction. Liverpool University Press. 1999. 250pp.
 Martin Roberts. Michel Tournier: Bricolage and Cultural Mythology. Anma Libri. 1994. 192pp.
 Jane Kathryn Stribling. Plenitude Restored, Or, Trompe L'oeil: The Problématic of Fragmentation and Integration in the Prose Works of Pierre Jean Jouve and Michel Tournier. Peter Lang. 1998. 339pp.
 Michel Tournier. The Wind Spirit: An Autobiography. Translated by Arthur Goldhammer. Beacon Press. 1988. 259pp.
 Michael Worton (editor). Michel Tournier. Longman. 1995. 220pp.
 Zhaoding Yang. Michel Tournier: La Conquête de la Grande Santé. Peter Lang. 2001. 175pp. Language: French.

External links

 
 

1924 births
2016 deaths
20th-century French novelists
21st-century French novelists
Writers from Paris
Prix Goncourt winners
University of Paris alumni
Grand Prix du roman de l'Académie française winners
French male novelists
20th-century French male writers
21st-century French male writers